Jasbir Singh Bains (born 7 February 1970), better known by his stage name Jasbir Jassi, is an Indian singer, lyricist, performer and actor.  he has released thirteen albums, his first pop album being Dil Le Gayee, released in 1998 with Times Music.

Early life
Bains, was born in Dalia Mirjanpur village, Gurdaspur, Punjab, India, to Sikh parents Ajit Singh and mother Prakash Kaur and brought up along with his two elder sisters. A first generation musician, he participated in musical plays such "Sadha Bugdu Bulo", and gave performances at the North Zone Cultural Centre.

Career
He started recording for Punjabi films including Passport and Zakhmi in the late 1980s. He also sang for remix albums such as Balle Balbiro Balle. His first album release was the 1993 low-profile Channa Ve Teri Channani. He appeared along with Charanjit Ahuja in the music video of "Channa ve Teri Channi". This was followed-up with a string of hit albums – 'Dil Le Gayee'(1998), 'Kudi Kudi'(1999), 'Nishani Pyar Di'(2001), 'Just Jassi'(2002), 'Mukhda Chann Varga'(2004) and 'Akh Mastani'(2007). Jassi - Back with a Bang is his latest album, featuring the songs "Mehndi" and title song "Bang". It was released on 16 July 2010 worldwide.

The title song Dil Le Gayee Kudi Gujarat Di of his second album was a commercial success. Kudi Kudi from his third album and Channo Da from Nishani Pyar Di also did extremely well.

He has performed in several countries, and has appeared on the NDTV Imagine's Dhoom Macha De. On the occasion of the 73rd Independence Day, Jassi and Punjabi singer Nobby Singh released a patriotic single track 'Azaadi - The Independence' dedicated to the country in August 2021.

Inspiration for Dil Le Gayee
In 1989 at a National Integration Camp in Himachal Pradesh for youth from border areas Jassi met his Gujarati kudi. The girl was from Bhuj in the Kutch area of Gujarat. She later married someone else, but Jassi traced her in 1998. In the same year, on way to Gwalior with Sham Bhuteja of Rohtak, when Jassi was feeling upset and depressed during the journey, and in a fit of emotion told Bhuteja, "dil le gayee kudi Gujarat di". He was inspired to compose the song after this line.

Soundtracks
The latest soundtrack in which Jassi performed is "Koka" from Khandaani Shafakhana  (2019) with Badshah and Dhvani Bhanushali Composed by Tanishk Bagchi. He sang and composed "Ek Onkar" for the film Kesari (2019) . He also sang for Patiala House (2011), in which he performed  "Laungda Lashkara with Mahalakshmi Iyer and Hard Kaur composed by Shankar-Ehsaan-Loy. Other soundtrack in which he performed include Dobara (2004) in which he performed "Pyar Mere", Hope and a Little Sugar (2006) in which he performed "Mahiya" and Mel Karade Rabba (2010) in which he performed the titular song. In 2015, Jassi released a song Ranjha giving the song Sufi and pahari touch. In 2016, he released the new Sufi trance song ‘'O Laal Ni’' written by Baba Bulle Shah.
In 2018, he made a comeback with his Song ‘'Tere Thumke’' written by Bhatti Bhariwala released under the Music Label TPZ Records.

Acting
In 2011, his first film in a lead role, 'Khushiyaan', was released. He was trained by N.K. Sharma and a few others. He has also appeared in some Punjabi films including Heer Ranjha.

Discography
According to Jassi's official website, he released thirteen albums:

Filmography

References

External links
Interview with Jasbir Jassi (The Tribune)

Living people
1970 births
Indian male singers
People from Punjab, India
People from Gurdaspur
Punjabi people